Startalk or StarTalk may refer to:

StarTalk (podcast), a science-themed podcast hosted by American astrophysicist Neil deGrasse Tyson
StarTalk (American talk show), an American television talk show hosted by Neil deGrasse Tyson, a spin-off of the podcast of the same name, which airs on National Geographic Channel
Startalk (Philippine talk show), an entertainment news and talk show
STARTALK (language program), an educational program of the University of Maryland